This is a list of international presidential trips made by George W. Bush, the 43rd president of the United States. George W. Bush made 49 international trips to 73 countries (in addition to visiting the West Bank) during his presidency, which began on January 20, 2001 and ended on January 20, 2009. 

Bush visited six continents: Africa, Asia, Australia, Europe, North America, and South America. On one of his two trips to Sub-Saharan Africa, he visited three of the poorest countries in the world at the time: Liberia, Rwanda, and Benin. He also made a secret trip to Iraq on Thanksgiving Day 2003 to dine with the troops. His father had made a similar visit to the U.S. troops in Saudi Arabia in 1990. On November 15–20, 2006, Bush made the third round the world presidential flight (after Johnson and Nixon).

Summary
The number of visits per country where President Bush travelled are:
 One visit to Albania, Argentina, Austria, Bahrain, Benin, Botswana, Bulgaria, Chile, Croatia, Denmark, El Salvador, Estonia, Georgia, Ghana, Guatemala, Hungary, India, Kosovo, Kuwait, Liberia, Lithuania, Mongolia, Netherlands, Nigeria, Pakistan, Panama, Philippines, Portugal, Qatar, Rwanda, Senegal, Slovakia, South Africa, Spain, Sweden, Tanzania, Turkey, Uganda, Ukraine, United Arab Emirates, Uruguay, Vietnam, and the West Bank
 Two visits to Afghanistan, Australia, Belgium, Brazil, Colombia, Czech Republic, Indonesia, Ireland, Israel, Jordan, Latvia, Peru, Romania, Saudi Arabia, Singapore, Slovenia, and Thailand
 Three visits to Egypt, South Korea, and Poland
 Four visits to Canada, China, France, Iraq, and Japan
 Five visits to Germany, the United Kingdom, and Vatican City
 Six visits to Italy and Mexico
 Seven visits to Russia

2001

2002

2003

2004

2005

2006

2007

2008

Multilateral meetings
Multilateral meetings of the following intergovernmental organizations took place during President Bush's term in office (2001–2009).

See also
 Foreign policy of the George W. Bush administration
 Foreign policy of the United States
 List of international trips made by Colin Powell as United States Secretary of State
 List of international trips made by Condoleezza Rice as United States Secretary of State

References

External links
 Travels of President George W. Bush. U.S. Department of State Office of the Historian.

Presidency of George W. Bush
21st century in international relations
2000s politics-related lists
Bush, George W., international
George W. Bush-related lists